The Estonia women's national volleyball team represents Estonia in international women's volleyball competitions and friendly matches.

As of 2020, team captain has been Julija Mõnnakmäe.

Results

European Volleyball League

European Championship
 2019 — 23rd place
 2023 — Qualified as the hosts

Team

Current squad
The following is the Estonian roster in the women's volleyball tournament of the 2022 European Volleyball League.

Head coach:  Alessandro Orefice

Statistics

Most games for Estonia

Players in bold are still active at club level.

See also
Estonia men's national volleyball team

References

External links

FIVB profile
CEV profile

National women's volleyball teams
Volleyball
Women's national team